Philip Bury Duncan (1772–1863) was keeper of the Ashmolean Museum at the University of Oxford.

Life
He was born in 1772 at South Warnborough, Hampshire, where his father was rector.  He was educated at Winchester College (where he afterwards founded the Duncan Prizes), and at New College, Oxford, of which he became a fellow in 1792. He graduated B.A. 1794, M.A. 1798. Among the school and college friends with whom he continued intimate were Archbishop William Howley, Bishop Richard Mant, and Sydney Smith. 

He was called to the bar in 1796, and for a few years attended the home and the western circuits. From 1801 until his death, he lived much at Bath, and promoted many local scientific and philanthropic schemes. 
He was elected president of the Bath United Hospital in 1841. 

In 1826, he was made keeper of the Ashmolean Museum, in succession to his elder brother, John Shute Duncan, author of Hints to the Bearers of Walking Sticks and Umbrella, anonymous, 3rd edition 1809; Botano Theology, 1825; and Analogies of Organised Beings, 1831. 
Philip Duncan increased the Ashmolean zoological collections, and himself gave many donations. He also presented to the university with casts of antique statues and various models. Duncan advocated the claims of physical science and mathematics to a prominent place in Oxford studies. He was instrumental in establishing at Oxford, as also at Bath, a savings bank and a society for the suppression of mendacity. 
He resigned his keepership in 1855, and was then given the honorary degree of D.C.L. 

Duncan died on 12 November 1863, at Westfield Lodge, his home, near Bath, aged 91. He was unmarried.

Character assessment
He was a man of simple habits and refined tastes. Archbishop Howley said of him and his brother:

Works
He had published in 1836 A Catalogue of the Ashmolean Museum, octavo, and in 1845 had printed at considerable cost a Catalogue of the manuscripts bequeathed by Ashmole to the University of Oxford (edited by W. H. Black).

Among Duncan's other publications were:
 An Essay on Sculpture [1830?], octavo.
 Reliquiæ Romanæ (on Roman antiquities in England and Wales), Oxford, 1836, octavo.
 Essays on Conversation and Quackery, 1836, duodecimo.
 Literary Conglomerate, Oxford, 1839, octavo.
 Essays and Miscellanea, Oxford, 1840, octavo.
 Motives of Wars, London, 1844, octavo.

Notes

References

Attribution
; Endnotes:
Gentlemen's Magazine 1864, 3rd ser. xvi. 122–6
Catalogue of Oxf. Grad.
British Museum Catalogue

1772 births
1863 deaths
English curators
English lawyers
People associated with the Ashmolean Museum